The Bloody Christmas of 1920 was a series of clashes in  Fiume (now Rijeka), which led to the conclusion of the Fiume campaign carried out by Italian poet and adventurer, Gabriele D'Annunzio in 1920.

Background
Upon the return of the liberal politician Giovanni Giolitti to government in June 1920, during the Biennio Rosso, the official attitude towards the Kingdom of Italy's regency of Carnaro constituted in Fiume began to waver. On November 12 of the same year, Italy and Yugoslavia signed the Treaty of Rapallo, forming the Free State of Fiume as a consequence to an occupation of Fiume by Gabriele d'Annunzio and his troops which began with the Impresa di Fiume. D'Annunzio entered Fiume as part of his and many Italians protest for an incomplete victory after World War I, because Italy was denied some of the Eastern Adriatic lands it claimed and was promised at its entry to the war.

Occupation
The resumption of Italy's premiership by the liberal Giovanni Giolitti in June 1920 signalled a hardening of official attitudes to d'Annunzio's coup. On 12 November, Italy and Yugoslavia concluded the Treaty of Rapallo, under which Fiume was to be an independent state, the Free State of Fiume, under a government acceptable to both.
D'Annunzio refused to accept an ultimatum by Italian General Enrico Caviglia to abandon Fiume and claimed the Treaty of Rapallo as illegal and his Regency declared war on Italy.

The Royal Italian Army launched a full-scale attack against Fiume on 24 December 1920: after several hours of intense fighting, a truce was proclaimed for Christmas day; the battle subsequently resumed on 26 December. Since D'Annunzio's legionnaires were refusing to surrender and were strongly resisting the attack using machine guns and grenades, the Italian dreadnoughts Andrea Doria and Duilio opened fired on Fiume and bombed the city for three days. D'Annunzio resigned on 28 December and the Regency capitulated on 30 December 1920, being occupied by Italian forces.

Following defeat
Following the defeat of d'Annunzio's forces, there was an election of the Constituent Assembly, giving autonomists and independentists an overwhelming victory with 65% of the vote. On 5 October 1921, Riccardo Zanella became the first and only elected president of the short lived Free State of Fiume, however this was unable to end disputes over the city.

Seven months later in Rome, Mussolini became prime minister, and Italy started heading towards a fascist regime. As a result, Zanella was overthrown in a putsch by local fascists in March 1922, resulting in an Italian military occupation of the city. This period of diplomatic tension ended with the Treaty of Rome on 27 January 1924, which assigned Fiume to Italy and Sušak along with other villages, to Yugoslavia, with joint port administration.

See also
Gabriele D'Annunzio
Free State of Fiume
Mutilated victory
Corpus separatum (Fiume)

References
Corrado Zoli. The days of Fiume. Zanichelli, Bologna., 1921.
Giuseppe Moscati. The five-day River. Publisher Carnaro. Second edition 1931
James Properzj Bloody Christmas, D'Annunzio in Fiume, Mursia Editore, Milan (2010) 
Giovanni Savegnago, critical review of Alla Festa Della Rivoluzione. Artisti e libertari con d'Annunzio a Fiume. (Claudia Salaris). Bologna. Il Mulino. 2002.
New York Times articles on the following dates of 1920: 24 November, December 2, 8, 9, 10, 11th, 13th, 24th, 27th, 28th, 30th.
Tea Mayhew: Maritime and History Museumof Croatian Littoral RijekaBloody Christmas 1920 – Gabriele D'Annunzio’s Rijeka Adventure 
https://web.archive.org/web/20120402022400/http://www.reakt.org/fiume/pdf/011_bloody_christmas.pdf
Bloody christmas in the book “Rijeka or death! D’Annunzio's occupation of Rijeka”
 
Kingdom of Italy (1861–1946)
Italian irredentism
History of Rijeka
Free State of Fiume
Wars involving Italy
1920 in Europe
1920 in Italy
Gabriele D'Annunzio
December 1920 events